This is a list of moths of the family Bombycidae that are found in India. It also acts as an index to the species articles and forms part of the full List of moths of India.

Subfamily Bombycinae

Genus Bombyx
 Bombyx mori Linnaeus, 1758 Note: an exotic species maintained in domestic situations only for the silk trade; native to China
 Bombyx lugubris (Drury, 1782) (= Theophila lugubris (Drury, 1782) sensu Hampson, 1892)
 Bombyx huttoni Westwood, 1847

Genus Triuncina
 Triuncina religiosae (Helfer, 1837) (= Theophila huttoni (Westwood, 1847) sensu Hampson, 1892)

Genus Ectrocta
 Ectrocta diaphana Hampson, 1892 [1893]

Genus Trilocha
 Trilocha varians (Walker, 1855) (= Ocinara varians Walker, 1855 sensu Hampson, 1892)

Genus Penicillifera
 Penicillifera apicalis (Walker, 1862) (= Ocinara apicalis Walker, 1862 and Ocinara signifera Walker, 1862 sensu Hampson, 1892)

Genus Gunda
 Gunda apicalis Hampson, 1892
 Gunda sikkima Moore, 1879

Genus Norasuma
 Norasuma javanica (Moore, 1872) (= Gunda javanica Moore, 1872 sensu Hampson, 1892)

Subfamily Prismostictinae

Genus Mustilia
 Mustilia falcipennis Walker, 1865
 Mustilia sphingiformis Moore, 1879
 Mustilia hepatica Moore, 1879

Genus Andraca
 Andraca bipunctata Walker, 1865

See also
Bombycidae
Moths
Lepidoptera
List of moths of India

References
 Hampson, G.F. et al. (1892–1937) Fauna of British India Including Ceylon and Burma - Moths. Vols. 1-5 cxix + 2813 p - 1295 figs - 1 table - 15 pl (12 in col.)
 Savela, Markku. Website on Lepidoptera and Some Other Life Forms - Page on Family Bombycidae (Accessed on 8 July 2007).

 

M